Journey Into Capricorn is the last studio album by American jazz musician Stan Kenton and his orchestra, released in late 1976, by Creative World Records. Recording sessions for the album took place in Hollywood, California on August 16–18, 1976. The initial release of the album titled both the album and the individual tune Journey To Capricorn.  The later release reworked the cover art and corrected both titles to JOURNEY INTO CAPRICORN.

Background

Though written by Mark Taylor, Granada Smoothie is very reminiscent of Hank Levy's compositions.  Taylor's well thought out arrangement of Too Shy To Say is a clever transformation of Stevie Wonder's pop music hit, the chart represents a continued push to keep Kenton's musical direction moving forward.

During the sessions two compositions were recorded but never got issued on the release: Ken Hanna's "Sensitivo" and Alan Yankee's arrangement of "Lush Life".  Producer Bob Curnow, "I have an uneasy feeling that the takes were not really the best on any of there unreleased material, but still it would be nice to have them out after all these years." Curnow is unclear who now possesses the unissued  Creative World masters; whether the masters were part of the deal with Gene Norman or if they are in possession of the Kenton estate.

Reception

Track listing

Too Shy To Say arranged by Mark Taylor and Celebration Suite arranged by Alan Yankee.

Personnel

Musicians
piano and leader: Stan Kenton
saxophones and flutes: Alan Yankee, Bill Fritz (track: 6), Dave Sova, Greg Metcalf, Roy Reynolds, Terry Layne
trumpets:  Dave Kennedy, Jay Sollenberger, Joe Casano, Steve Campos, Tim Hagans
trombones: Allan Morrissey, Dick Shearer, Jeff Uusitalo, Mike Egan, Doug Purviance (bass trombone)
tuba: Mike Wallace
acoustic and electric bass: John Worster
drum set: Gary Hobbs
percussion: Ramon Lopez

Production
Bob Curnow, Bill Putnam, Stan Kenton – production
Jerry Barnes – recording engineering
Jordana Von Spiro – art direction
Dennis Millard – cover art
Gene Lees – liner notes
Jerry Barnes – mix engineer

References

Bibliography
 
  pp. 273–75.
  pp. 216ff.

External links
 
 Journey Into Capricorn at Allmusic
 Live at Redlands University at All Things Kenton

Instrumental albums
1976 albums
Stan Kenton albums
GNP Crescendo Records albums